Michael Carroll (born 29 March 1983 in Swaffham, Norfolk) was an English winner of the UK National Lottery.

A former binman, Carroll won £9,736,131 on the National Lottery in November 2002, aged 19. He enjoyed celebrity status for a time in the British tabloid media as the "Lotto lout" and the self-proclaimed "King of Chavs".

Early life
Carroll's mother worked in a canning factory and his father was a Royal Air Force engineer. When Carroll was 18 months old, his father was jailed in a military prison for 11 years for stabbing a couple after getting into a fight at a dance. His parents separated when he was seven years old; his father died from a heart attack when Carroll was ten. He had several stepfathers, one of whom would lock him in his room for hours after hitting him. Carroll stated he was dyslexic, had ADHD, and was barely literate by the time he finished secondary school.

When Carroll was 13, he received a custodial sentence for shoplifting and was sent to the Hollesley Bay Prison in Suffolk where he reports that he learned to read and write. When Carroll won the  Lotto at the age of 19, he was employed part-time as a binman. At the time of his big win, Carroll did not have a bank account, and tried opening one at Coutts as recommended by Camelot. Coutts refused his application, which Carroll later ascribed to his extensive criminal record.

Lottery winner
Soon after winning the jackpot, Carroll stated he would not be tempted into spending his money lavishly and only wanted to buy a three-bedroom house near a lake, where he could go fishing. As a fan of Rangers, Carroll invested up to £1,000,000 of his winnings via Rangers Financial Management, from whom the football club receive a share of profits on the financial services they sell.

Another investment Carroll made with advice was to set up a £3.9 million investment bond, which generated monthly income. He was advised to use this account only if funds from a regular account were gone. Once withdrawals are made from the bond, however, huge penalty fees were deducted; plus the amount of the withdrawal. Carroll, who was very generous to family and friends, gave his mother, aunt and a sister £1,000,000 each, and claimed by September 2003, he had to start living off the proceeds of the bond.

In 2005, Carroll participated in a celebrity boxing match in which he seemed to be defeated by Mark Smith, formerly a star of TV show Gladiators under the name Rhino, but the fight was officially declared a draw by the judges. Also in 2006, he was the subject of the documentary Michael Carroll: King of Chavs.

In June 2005, Carroll was given an ASBO by the court after it was found that whilst drunk, he had been catapulting steel balls from his Mercedes van, which resulted in breaking 32 car and shop windows, in Downham Market, where he was living. He was sentenced to 240 hours of community service and a warning, he could face a custodial sentence if he did not adhere to the ASBO.

In February 2006, he was jailed for nine months for affray. It was noted in court while being sentenced that, since 1997, Carroll had 42 previous offences on record.

In 2006, the BBC reported that he was almost broke, having spent his fortune on new homes, drugs, parties, jewellery and cars.  Carroll subsequently denied rumours that he had no money left.

While living at his mansion in Swaffham, five of his Rottweilers were found dead with their throats cut. He paid the £130,000 ransom fee to blackmailers who threatened his family. He said the men came with shotguns and said "You aren't so big now are you, Mr. Carroll?". He took off in his car and he never went back to Swaffham, he claimed. He ended up returning to Downham Market.

In May 2010, he reapplied for his old job as a binman, but said he had no regrets about the way in which he spent his winnings.

His biography written by Sean Boru, entitled Careful What You Wish For was published by John Blake Publishing in October 2006. In 2010, he appeared as a fictionalised version of himself in the film Killer Bitch.

See also
Notable people from Norfolk

References

1983 births
21st-century criminals
British people convicted of theft
English criminals
Living people
Lottery winners
People from Swaffham
Chairmen and investors of football clubs in Scotland
People with dyslexia